Wilma Rusman née Zukrowski (born 14 May 1958 in Sittard) is a retired female long-distance runner from the Netherlands. She won the 1985 edition of the Rotterdam Marathon, clocking 2:35:32 on April 20, 1985.

Achievements

References

athlinks

1958 births
Living people
Dutch female long-distance runners
Dutch female marathon runners
People from Sittard
Sportspeople from Limburg (Netherlands)
20th-century Dutch women
20th-century Dutch people